Kenny Chiu  (born 1965) is a Canadian former politician who was elected to represent the riding of Steveston—Richmond East in the House of Commons of Canada in the 2019 federal election.

Chiu immigrated to Canada in 1982 from Hong Kong, and studied computer science at the University of Saskatchewan. In 2011, he was elected as a Richmond school board trustee. He ran in the 2015 federal election for Steveston—Richmond East and was defeated by Joe Peschisolido. He ran again in 2019, this time defeating Peschisolido.

He lost to Liberal candidate, Parm Bains, at the 2021 federal election. He was an outspoken critic of Beijing’s crackdown on dissent and protest in Hong Kong and that may have led to a disinformation campaign against him contributing to his defeat.

Electoral record

References

Living people
Conservative Party of Canada MPs
Members of the House of Commons of Canada from British Columbia
21st-century Canadian politicians
Hong Kong emigrants to Canada
People from Richmond, British Columbia
1965 births